Louis Aloysius Lootens (March 17, 1827 – January 12, 1898) was a Belgian prelate of the Catholic Church. He served as the first Vicar Apostolic of Idaho (now the Diocese of Boise) from 1868 to 1876.

Biography

Early life and priesthood
Lootens was born in Bruges on March 17, 1827, the fourth of nine children of Charles and Catherine (née Beyaert) Lootens. His father was a carpenter and his mother was a lacemaker. After receiving his classical education in his native country, he studied for the priesthood at the seminary at Saint-Nicolas-du-Chardonnet in Paris.

During his final year of studies, Bishop Modeste Demers was touring Europe to recruit priests for the Diocese of Vancouver Island and Lootens offered his services. He was ordained a priest by Bishop Demers in Paris on June 14, 1851. The following year he, Demers, and two other clerics arrived in Victoria, British Columbia, on August 29, 1852.

After five years of missionary work at mining camps and Native American villages in the Cariboo and Fraser Valley region, Lootens was accepted into the Archdiocese of San Francisco in June 1857. He was entrusted with an extensive area that included Mariposa, La Grange, and Hornitos. A year later he was transferred to Sonora as pastor of St. Patrick's Church. He remained there until 1859, when he assumed charge of both St. Vincent's Church at Petaluma and St. Raphael's Church in San Rafael. In addition to his pastoral work, he served as director of St. Vincent's School for Boys in San Rafael (1859–1868). During his administration of the school, he added schoolrooms, dormitories, an administration building, and a chapel to accommodate a growing student population. The city of San Rafael was so grateful for his work that a street (Lootens Place) was named in his honor.

Episcopal ministry
On March 3, 1868, Lootens was appointed the first Vicar Apostolic of the Idaho Territory and titular bishop of Castabala by Pope Pius IX. He received his episcopal consecration on the following August 9 from Archbishop Joseph Sadoc Alemany, with Bishops Thaddeus Amat y Brusi and Eugene O'Connell serving as co-consecrators, at Old St. Mary's Cathedral in San Francisco.

Lootens arrived in Idaho in January 1869 and took up residence at Granite Creek. At the end of that year, he left for Rome to participate in the First Vatican Council (1869–1870). The first Catholic church in Boise was dedicated in December 1870 but it burned down just a month later in January 1871.

During Lootens' tenure, the Catholic population of Idaho dropped from 15,000 to 1,000. In 1866, when the Second Plenary Council of Baltimore had proposed creating a vicariate, Idaho was still in the fever of its first boom. However, by the 1870s, the placer mining industry was beginning to fail and large numbers of miners were leaving. In March 1873, Lootens wrote: "The Catholic population of the Vicariate Apostolic of Idaho having dwindled away to such an extent that the remainder does no longer afford us...the bare necessaries of life." His health also began to suffer and he submitted his resignation, which was accepted by Rome on February 27, 1876. It would be more than eight years before a successor, fellow Belgian Alphonse Joseph Glorieux, was appointed.

Later life and death
Lootens returned to British Columbia, where he began his priestly ministry, and was named an auxiliary bishop of the Diocese of Vancouver Island. As the oldest cleric in the diocese, he laid the cornerstone of the new St. Andrew's Cathedral at Victoria in 1890. In 1895 he published a book on the Gregorian chant.

Lootens died in Victoria on January 12, 1898, at age 70. He is buried at Our Lady of Assumption Church Cemetery in Saanich.

See also

 Historical list of the Catholic bishops of the United States

References 

1827 births
1898 deaths
19th-century Belgian Roman Catholic priests
Roman Catholic bishops of Boise
19th-century Roman Catholic bishops in the United States
Belgian emigrants to the United States
Belgian Roman Catholic titular bishops
Clergy from Bruges